David Shambaugh (born January 18, 1953) is the Gaston Sigur Professor of Asian Studies, Political Science & International Affairs, and director of the China Policy Program at the Elliott School of International Affairs, George Washington University, Washington DC. He is also a non-resident senior fellow at the Brookings Institution.

Biography
Shambaugh is the son of George E. Shambaugh, Jr., a physician. David Shambaugh earned his bachelor's degree from the Elliott School of International Affairs of George Washington University, where he now teaches. He received his Masters of Arts in international affairs from the Johns Hopkins University's Paul H. Nitze School of Advanced International Studies, and earned his PhD in political science from the University of Michigan, where he studied with Michel Oksenberg.

Shambaugh is the Gaston Sigur Professor of Asian Studies, Political Science & International Affairs, and director of the China Policy Program at the Elliott School of International Affairs, George Washington University, Washington D.C. He specialises in China's domestic politics, China's foreign relations, China's military and security, and international relations of Asia. Regarded inside and outside China as an authority on China's foreign policy, military and security issues and Chinese politics, Shambaugh has been cited in the state media. He is a regular media commentator, and has acted as an advisor to the United States government and several private foundations and corporations. He was formerly the editor of the China Quarterly, and is a member of the Council on Foreign Relations. Shambaugh's book China Goes Global was selected by The Economist as one of the best books of the year. In 2015, researchers at the China Foreign Affairs University named him the second-most influential China expert in the United States, behind David M. Lampton.

Bibliography

 
 China's Military in Transition (1991)
 Beautiful Imperialist (1993)
 Deng Xiaoping: Portrait of a Chinese Statesman (1995)
 Chinese Foreign Policy: Theory and Practice (1996)
 The China Reader: The Reform Era (1998)
 China's Military Faces the Future (1999)
 Is China Unstable: Assessing the Factors (2000)
 The Modern Chinese State (2000)
 The Odyssey of China's Imperial Art Treasures (2005)
 Modernizing China's Military (2003)
 Power Shift: China & Asia's New Dynamics (2005)
 China-Europe Relations (2007)
 China Watching: Perspectives from Europe, Japan, and the United States (2007)
 American and European Relations with China (2008)
 China's Communist Party: Atrophy & Adaptation (2008)
 International Relations of Asia (2008)
 Charting China's Future: Domestic and International Challenges (2011)
 China Goes Global: The Partial Power (Oxford University Press, 2013)
 China's Future (Polity, 2016)
 
China and the World (Oxford University Press, 2020).
Where Great Powers Meet: America and China in Southeast Asia (Oxford University Press, 2020).
China's Leaders: From Mao to Now (Polity, 2021)

References

External links

The China Challenge May 8, 2014 issue New York Review of Books including Shambaugh 2013 book

1953 births
Living people
American political scientists
American sinologists
Elliott School of International Affairs alumni
Elliott School of International Affairs faculty
Paul H. Nitze School of Advanced International Studies alumni
Quarterly Essay people
University of Michigan alumni